The 1982 Cal State Northridge  Matadors football team represented California State University, Northridge as a member of the Western Football Conference (WFC) during the 1982 NCAA Division II football season. Led by fourth-year head coach Tom Keele, Cal State Northridge compiled an overall record of 4–7 with a mark of 2–2 in conference play, placing third in the WFC. The team was outscored by its opponents 287 to 257 for the season. The Matadors played home games at North Campus Stadium in Northridge, California.

1982 was the first season for the Western Football Conference. In its initial season, the WFC had five teams. Three of them were the final members of the California Collegiate Athletic Association (CCAA): Cal State Northridge, Cal Poly Pomona, and Cal Poly). They were joined by Santa Clara and Portland State, both of which had been independents.

Schedule

References

Cal State Northridge
Cal State Northridge Matadors football seasons
Cal State Northridge Matadors football